The men's team foil was one of seven fencing events on the fencing at the 1956 Summer Olympics programme. It was the ninth appearance of the event. The competition was held 23 November 1956. 50 fencers from 9 nations competed.

Competition format
The competition used a pool play format, with each team facing the other teams in the pool in a round robin. Each match consisted of 16 bouts, with 4 fencers on one team facing each of the 4 fencers on the other team. Bouts were to 5 touches. Total touches against were the tie-breaker if a match was tied 8 bouts to 8. However, only as much fencing was done as was necessary to determine advancement, so some matches never occurred and some matches were stopped before the full 16 bouts were fenced if the teams advancing from the pool could be determined.

Rosters

Australia
 Ray Buckingham
 Brian McCowage
 Rod Steel
 David McKenzie
 Michael Sichel
 Tom Cross

Belgium
 Jacques Debeur
 Ghislain Delaunois
 Marcel Van Der Auwera
 André Verhalle

Colombia
 Pablo Uribe
 Emilio Echeverry
 Gabriel Blando
 Emiliano Camargo

France
 Claude Netter
 Bernard Baudoux
 Jacques Lataste
 Roger Closset
 Christian d'Oriola
 René Coicaud

Great Britain
 René Paul
 Bill Hoskyns
 Raymond Paul
 Allan Jay
 Ralph Cooperman

Hungary
 Endre Tilli
 József Sákovics
 József Gyuricza
 Mihály Fülöp
 Lajos Somodi, Sr.
 József Marosi

Italy
 Edoardo Mangiarotti
 Manlio Di Rosa
 Giancarlo Bergamini
 Antonio Spallino
 Luigi Carpaneda
 Vittorio Lucarelli

Soviet Union
 Yury Rudov
 Iuri Osip'ovi
 Mark Midler
 Aleksandr Ovsyankin
 Viktor Zhdanovich
 Yury Ivanov

United States
 Albie Axelrod
 Daniel Bukantz
 Hal Goldsmith
 Byron Krieger
 Nate Lubell
 Skip Shurtz

Results

Round 1

The top two nations in each pool advanced to the semifinal.

Pool 1

In the first match, Belgium defeated the Soviet Union 9–7. The Soviet Union then defeated France 9–7. The third match ended when France took a 10–4 lead over Belgium, ensuring that all teams would finish 1–1 and Belgium would necessarily lose the three-way tie based on individual bouts.

Pool 2

In the first match, Great Britain defeated Colombia 15–1. In the second, Italy reached 9 wins without a loss against Colombia to win the match; because this put Colombia at 0–2 and guaranteed advancement for the other two teams, the Italy–Colombia match was halted.

Pool 3

In the first match, the United States defeated Australia 13–3. In the second, Hungary and Australia each won 8 bouts, but Hungary prevailed on touches against (57–65). This eliminated Australia at 0–2 and advanced the other two teams, so the United States did not face Hungary.

Semifinals

The top two teams in each semifinal advanced to the final.

Semifinal 1

In the first match, the United States defeated Great Britain 9–7. In the second, Italy and Great Britain tied: not only in bouts, 8–8, but in touches, 56–56. For the third and final match, then, Italy needed only to do better against the United States than Great Britain had; as soon as Italy won its 8th bout against the United States (leading the match 8–4), the pool was finished. That the United States could still have come back to win against Italy was immaterial; those two would advance regardless, with Great Britain eliminated.

Semifinal 2

Hungary (11–5) and France (9–4) each defeated the Soviet Union, with the French–Soviet match stopped as soon as France reached 9 wins due to the certainty of the Soviet Union's elimination.

Final

The first two pairings saw France defeat the United States (10–6) and Italy beat Hungary (8–8, 59–63). France and Italy each won again in the second pairings, this time France over Hungary (11–5) and Italy against the United States (9–7). With two 2–0 teams and two 0–2 teams, the third set of pairings in the round-robin were effectively a gold medal match and a bronze medal match. Hungary defeated the United States 9–5 to take the bronze medal, while Italy prevailed over France 9–7 for the gold.

References

Foil team
Men's events at the 1956 Summer Olympics